The Midland Railway 700 Class was a large class of double framed 0-6-0 freight steam locomotives designed by Matthew Kirtley for the Midland Railway.  They were in the power classification 1F.

Early withdrawals
Six locomotives - nos. 271/9, 1007/31/52/3 - were withdrawn from service between 1903 and 1905.

Fifty more were sold in 1906 to the Italian State Railway, Ferrovie dello Stato Italiane (FS), where they formed FS Class 380; they had been ordered by one of the constituents of the FS, the Rete Mediterranea. They were meant to fill a gap of valid locomotives after the nationalization of the Italian railways, and therefore were not thought to remain in service for more than a few years; however, some of them remained active into the 1920s.

Numbering
After the Midland Railway's 1907 renumbering scheme, the numbers were:
 2592–2671, 2674–2711 and 2713–2867
Numbers 2672/3 were members of the 480 Class; no. 2712 was a member of the 240 Class, which had been given a number in the wrong series as the result of a clerk's error.

Accidents and incidents
On 3 December 1892, locomotive No. 871 was hauling a freight train that crashed at Wymondham Junction, Leicestershire, severely damaging the signal box.

Military service
78 locomotives of the class were loaned to the War Department during the First World War and were used by the Railway Operating Division of the Royal Engineers for military duties in France. A further three were selected to go but instead were loaned to the London and South Western Railway (LSWR) between December 1917 and February 1920 The locomotives allocated were 2707–11/13–88 of which 2783–85 were sent to the LSWR.  The remainder went to France at various dates in 1917 before being returned to the MR in 1919–20.  All returned to service with the MR except 2765, which was scrapped at Derby in 1920 after suffering broken frames during its time with the ROD.  

One engine, 2717, was cut off in No man's land during the Battle of Cambrai in November 1917 and was subsequently captured by the German army during Operation Michael. The Germans salvaged the engine and used it on their military railway in the Brussels area. Recovered after the war, the engine was returned to the MR.

See also
 Locomotives of the Midland Railway

Notes

References 

0700
0-6-0 locomotives
Railway Operating Division locomotives
Dübs locomotives
Kitson locomotives
Neilson locomotives
Vulcan Foundry locomotives
Standard gauge steam locomotives of Great Britain
Railway locomotives introduced in 1869
Scrapped locomotives